Daystar (stylized in all caps) is the fifth studio album by Canadian rapper Tory Lanez. It was released on September 25, 2020, by One Umbrella Records and was his first independent release after departing from Interscope Records. The music was largely written by Lanez and produced with a  variety of record producers, while featuring a sole guest appearance by fellow rapper Yoko Gold.

Controversy followed the album when it was released amid criminal allegations against Lanez that he had shot fellow rapper Megan Thee Stallion earlier in 2020. Many critics chose not to review the album, and some writers condemned Lanez for using it to deny the allegations. Commercially, Daystar charted at number six in Canada and became the rapper's fifth straight album to debut in the top 10 of the US Billboard 200 earning 36,000 album-equivalent units in its first week.

Release and aftermath 
Lanez released Daystar in part as a response to criminal allegations of him shooting fellow rapper Megan Thee Stallion earlier in 2020. Several songs on the album feature Lanez denying the accusations, including the opening song "Money Over Fallouts", in which he expresses shock at Megan Thee Stallion:

Many critics opted not to review Daystar, while others accused Lanez of "gaslighting his fans" with its address of the shooting allegations, according to AllHipHop reporter Yohance Kyles. Vulture writer Chris Murphy responded to the album's release with the headline: "For The Love of God, Do Not Listen to Tory Lanez's New Album DAYSTAR". Andre Gee of Complex called the album "a project too contemptible to be evaluated on any musical scale" and "much worse than just a terrible album", dismissing it as an attempt by Lanez at using his platform to justify his abuse of black women. Highsnobiety announced that they would no longer cover Lanez's music, and called Daystar "the most toxic album of the year".

While the case against Lanez remained postponed, the rapper followed Daystar with the release of Loner in December 2020 and Playboy in March 2021. In May, he responded on Twitter to the backlash against the album, saying, "When I do something nice it's genuinely out of the love of my heart and the pain I feel for people in need ... I don't care about repairing an image that people tried to smear and couldn't. All I can do is play my part. And I'm proud of the part I play."

Commercial performanceDaystar debuted at number ten on the US Billboard 200 chart, earning 36,000 album-equivalent units (including 2,000 copies as traditional album sales) in its first week. This became Lanez's sixth album to debut in the top 10 of the chart, although it was also the lowest Billboard'' 200 debut of his career. The album also accumulated a total of 47.7 million on-demand streams of the album's songs during that week.

Track listingNotes'''
  signifies a co-producer

Charts

References

External links 
 

Tory Lanez albums
2020 albums
Music controversies
Music based on actual events
Emo rap albums